Sober Driver is a 2019 Russian comedy film directed by Rezo Gigineishvili.

Plot 
A young naive provincial Artyom comes to a friend in Moscow in the hope of a new beautiful life, but first he has to help him in the difficult night work of a "Sober Driver". On the first evening, taking the beautiful Christina out of the nightclub, Artyom, by a misunderstanding, finds himself in an expensive hotel room with her. Completely not remembering the events of last night, Christine takes the guy for a young millionaire, and he, in turn, is in no hurry to disappoint her. With each date Artyom falls in love more and more, but getting out of ridiculous situations becomes more difficult.

Cast 
 Viktor Khorinyak as Artyom
 Andrey Burkovsky as Stanislav
 Irina Martynenko as Kristina 
 Yanina Studilina as Katya 
 Kirill Simonenko as representative "StopHam"
 Dmitriy Kulichkov as Nikolay 
 Evgeniy Sangadzhiev as Bellboy 
 Natalya Zhernakova as Artyom's mom
 Sergey Belyaev as Anatoliy
 Maria Poezzhaeva as activist girl

Release 
The film was released on March 21, 2019.

References

External links 
 

2019 films
2010s Russian-language films
Russian comedy films
2019 comedy films